Beverly Sanders (born September 2, 1940) is an American actress, comedian, and voice artist. She was born in Hollywood, California.

Career
Sanders studied acting in New York with Lee Strasberg's Actor Studio. She is married and has an adopted daughter.

On television, Sanders often played the stereotypical blonde, the nice mom, or the star's girlfriend.  She played supporting roles to both Mary Tyler Moore and Valerie Harper in their respective sitcoms and in several TV movies with Moore.

She also starred in her own one-woman show on stage entitled Yes Sir, That's My Baby in the late 90s. She began writing the play after taking a UCLA writing class. The show details her failure to conceive a baby at 40+ years of age, and then the later frustrations of the adoption process.

Sanders has appeared in over 300 commercials. She played the Arm & Hammer Baking Soda spokesperson Louise for nearly a decade.

Filmography

Television

Films

References

External links

1940 births
American women comedians
American film actresses
American television actresses
Living people
Actresses from Hollywood, Los Angeles
20th-century American actresses
21st-century American actresses
Comedians from California
20th-century American comedians
21st-century American comedians